Rebellion  is a 1936 American Western film directed by Lynn Shores and starring Tom Keene, Rita Hayworth, and Duncan Renaldo.

Cast
Tom Keene as Captain John Carroll
Rita Hayworth as Paula Castillo (credited as Rita Cansino)
Duncan Renaldo as Ricardo Castillo
William Royle as Harris
Gino Corrado as Pablo
Roger Gray as Honeycutt
Bob McKenzie as Judge Moore
Allan Cavan as President Zachary Taylor (credited as Allen Cavan)
Jack Ingram as Henchman Hank
Lita Cortez as Marquita
Theodore Lorch as General Vallejo (credited as Theodore Lorsch)
Merrill McCormick as Dr. Semple (credited as W. M. McCormick)
Ralph Bucko as Henchman (uncredited)
Allen Greer as Castillo Rider (uncredited)
Al Haskell as Gang Member (uncredited)
George Regas as Gang Member (uncredited)

References

External links

1936 films
American Western (genre) films
1936 Western (genre) films
American black-and-white films
Cultural depictions of Zachary Taylor
Films directed by Lynn Shores
1930s American films
1930s English-language films